Obra Thermal Power Station , Obra is located in Sonbhadra district in the Indian state of Uttar Pradesh, about  from Chopan Railway Station and about  from Varanasi. The power plant holds the distinction of being the first 200 MW unit of India. It is owned and operated by Uttar Pradesh Rajya Vidyut Utpadan Nigam Limited

Operations 
There are thirteen functioning units, all of which are coal-fired thermal power stations. The machinery for the most of the units are from Bharat Heavy Electricals Limited. The last unit of 200 MW was commissioned in 1982.

Capacity 
Obra Thermal Power Station has a generating capacity of 1288 MW and an auxiliary bus charged from 3*33 mW hydro power plant. Constructions have been underway to add two units of 660 MW each to the power plant.

References

 https://web.archive.org/web/20091030072314/http://uprvunl.org/obra.htm

Coal-fired power stations in Uttar Pradesh
Buildings and structures in Sonbhadra district
1967 establishments in Uttar Pradesh
Energy infrastructure completed in 1967